Garrett Lee Withers (June 21, 1884 – April 30, 1953) was an American politician and lawyer. As a Democrat, he represented Kentucky in the United States Senate and United States House of Representatives.

Withers was born on a farm in Webster County, Kentucky. He was admitted to the bar in 1908 and was a practicing attorney in Webster County from 1911 to 1953. He was elected clerk of Webster County Circuit Court and served from 1910 to 1912, and later as a master commissioner from 1913 to 1917. He served as a member of the Kentucky Highway Commission from 1932 to 1936; as a Referee in Bankruptcy from 1941 to 1945; and as an appointed commissioner for the Kentucky Department of Highways from 1947 to 1949.

He was appointed on January 20, 1949, to the United States Senate to fill the vacancy caused by the resignation of Alben W. Barkley to become Vice President of the United States. Withers served from January 20, 1949, until a special election was held in November to fill the seat for the remainder of the term. Withers was not a candidate for the special election to the seat to which he was appointed.

Withers won election to the Kentucky House of Representatives in 1951 and then won a special election (due to the death of Rep. John A. Whitaker) on August 2, 1952, to the United States House of Representatives. He served as a Democrat in the Eighty-second Congress and was reelected to the Eighty-third Congress. He served from August 2, 1952, until his death in the naval hospital at Bethesda, Maryland, on April 30, 1953.

See also
 List of United States Congress members who died in office (1950–99)

References

Official Congressional Directory: 83d Congress, 1st Session (1953) 

Democratic Party members of the Kentucky House of Representatives
1884 births
1953 deaths
People from Webster County, Kentucky
Democratic Party United States senators from Kentucky
Democratic Party members of the United States House of Representatives from Kentucky
20th-century American politicians
20th-century American lawyers
Kentucky lawyers